Michelle Glass is a New Zealand pharmacology academic. She is currently a full professor and Head of the Department of Pharmacology & Toxicology at the University of Otago.

Career 
Since a 1994 PhD titled  'Receptor alterations in human neuro-degenerative diseases'  at the University of Auckland, she has worked at both the University of Auckland and the University of Otago, rising to full professor.

Glass's primary work has been on cannabinoids and they have received multiple grants for the work and considerable press attention. She has also been involved in a documentary 'Mum, Cannabis and Me'

More recently, Prof Glass has applied her expertise in G protein-coupled receptors to the forest pathogen, kauri dieback. In 2018, she received a grant from the Marsden Fund entitled "Applying human drug discovery approaches to kauri dieback"

Selected works 
 Glass, M., R. L. M. Faull, and M. Dragunow. "Cannabinoid receptors in the human brain: a detailed anatomical and quantitative autoradiographic study in the fetal, neonatal and adult human brain." Neuroscience 77, no. 2 (1997): 299–318.
 Glass, Michelle, and Christian C. Felder. "Concurrent stimulation of cannabinoid CB1 and dopamine D2 receptors augments cAMP accumulation in striatal neurons: evidence for a Gs linkage to the CB1 receptor." Journal of Neuroscience 17, no. 14 (1997): 5327–5333.
 Buckley, Nancy E., Kathleen L. McCoy, Éva Mezey, Tom Bonner, Anne Zimmer, Christian C. Felder, Michelle Glass, and Andreas Zimmer. "Immunomodulation by cannabinoids is absent in mice deficient for the cannabinoid CB2 receptor." European Journal of Pharmacology 396, no. 2-3 (2000): 141–149.
 Glass, M., M. Dragunow, and R. L. M. Faull. "The pattern of neurodegeneration in Huntington's disease: a comparative study of cannabinoid, dopamine, adenosine and GABAA receptor alterations in the human basal ganglia in Huntington's disease." Neuroscience 97, no. 3 (2000): 505–519.
 Felder, Christian C., and Michelle Glass. "Cannabinoid receptors and their endogenous agonists." Annual Review of Pharmacology and toxicology 38, no. 1 (1998): 179–200.
 Kearn, Christopher S., Katherine Blake-Palmer, Emma Daniel, Ken Mackie, and Michelle Glass. "Concurrent stimulation of cannabinoid CB1 and dopamine D2 receptors enhances heterodimer formation: a mechanism for receptor crosstalk?." Molecular Pharmacology (2005).
 Robson, Hunter, Rhiannon Braund, Michelle Glass, Janelle Ashton, Michael Tatley. "Synthetic cannabis: adverse events reported to the New Zealand Pharmacovigilance Centre." Clinical Toxicology (2020).

References

External links
  
 

Living people
New Zealand pharmacologists
New Zealand women academics
Recipients of Marsden grants
Year of birth missing (living people)
New Zealand women writers